The association football tournament at the Indian Ocean Island Games (French: Jeux des îles de l'océan Indien) which is organised every 4 years for the Islands in the Indian Ocean. 

From 1947 until 1963 a precursor called Triangulaire was organized between Madagascar, Mauritius and Réunion Island. The first official edition of Indian Ocean Island Games was held in 1979.

The competition has been won by its host country on seven of the ten occasions it has been held.

Participants

Past results

1 The match was scratched and Comoros were awarded third place as Mauritius were unable to travel to Réunion for the match.

2 The match was scratched and Comoros were awarded third place as Madagascar failed to appear at the stadium for the match.

Final Positions

Women's tournament
In 2015 a women's tournament was held.

References

 
Sports at the Indian Ocean Island Games
International association football competitions in Africa
Indian Ocean Island Games